The Chinese Taipei women's national football team has represented Taiwan at the FIFA Women's World Cup on one occasion, in 1991.

FIFA Women's World Cup record

Record by opponent

1991 FIFA Women's World Cup

Group C

Quarterfinals

Goalscorers

References

 
Countries at the FIFA Women's World Cup